Yoo Jae-geon (19 September 1937 – 1 December 2022) was a South Korean politician. He had membership in multiple political parties and served in the National Assembly from 1996 to 2008.

Yoo died on 1 December 2022, at the age of 85.

References

1937 births
2022 deaths
Democratic Party (South Korea, 2000) politicians
Uri Party politicians
Advancement Unification Party politicians
Members of the National Assembly (South Korea)
Kyunggi High School alumni
Brigham Young University alumni
Washington State University alumni
University of California, Davis alumni
Academic staff of Yonsei University
Academic staff of Korea University
Academic staff of Seoul National University
People from Seoul